Igaci is a municipality in the Brazilian state of Alagoas. 
It has an area of 334.346 square kilometres (129.091 sq mi).
The climate is tropical savanna climate.
As of 2020 the estimated population was 25,613.

Geography

Igaci is in the state of Alagoas, Brazil.
It is located in the Palmeira dos Índios micro-region. 
It is 161 km from Maceió.

History

The settlement that is now the municipality of Igaci was founded by João de Lima Acioli of Portugal in the mid-19th century.
The original name was Olho D'Água do Acioli, or Acioli's Waterholes, due to the many pools in the region.
The abundant water attracted many families from areas that suffered from droughts, particularly in 1877, when there was a severe drought in Alagoas.
The first urban settlement of the municipality was founded soon after.
Early settlers in the town were Serapião Sampaio, Santos Silva, captain Bartolomeu de Souza Vergueiro, Justino Luiz, the Torres and Tomas de Albuquerque families and Carlos Pontes who later became an important figure in Brazilian literature and national politics.

Olho D'Água do Acioli was named a town and judicial district of  Palmeira dos Índios by State law No. 428 of 15 June 1904.
The town became more important when the Grewestern railway reached it, now operated by the Rede Ferroviária Federal do Nordeste.
At this time its name was changed to Igaci, the indigenous word for waterhole. 
Many cotton gins began operation to process the local harvest, although as of 2017 only one remained. 
Law No. 2087 of 27 December 1857 established Igaci as a separate municipality from Palmeira dos Índios effective 12 January 1959.
It has a single district, Igaci.

Climate

The Köppen climate type is As : Tropical savanna climate.
The climate is hot and humid. Winter normally lasts from May to August.

Demographics

The population in the 2010 census was 25,188.
The estimated population as of 2020 was 25,613.
As of 2010, 94.3% of the population had attended school between the ages of 6 and 14. 
Also as of 2010, the municipal Human Development Index was 0.564.
This compares to 0.241 in 1991 and 0.366 in 2000.

On the 2010 census religion was reported as Catholic by 23,131 people, Evangelical by 1,156 people and Animism by 0 people.

The municipality has two main festivities: Political Emancipation Day and the festival of the patron saint Nossa Senhora da Saúde.

Economy 

In 2017, the average monthly salary was 1.8 minimum wages. 
Employed people were 5.0% of the  total population. 
Households with monthly income of up to half a minimum wage per person represent 54.3% of the population.
Recent estimates of GDP per capita:

Health and sanitation

6.2% of households have adequate sanitation, 94.3% of urban households are on public roads with afforestation and 9.4% of urban households are on public roads with adequate urbanization (presence of manhole, sidewalk, pavement and curb).
Annual hospitalizations due to diarrhea are 1.4 per 1,000 inhabitants.
Deaths per 1,000 live births:

 2006: 25.35 
 2007: 13.36
 2008: 14.80
 2009: 18.82
 2010: 23.58
 2011: 14.35
 2012: 11.94
 2013: 15.63
 2014: 16.13
 2015: 8.70
 2016: 15.24
 2017: 17.86

Municipal finances

Recent figures for committed municipal expenditure:

Recent figures for realized municipal revenue:

References

Sources

Municipalities in Alagoas